Aubrey Foard is an American tubist residing in Baltimore, Maryland.

Professional career 

Foard has been the Principal Tubist of the Baltimore Symphony Orchestra since September, 2018. He is also a Lecturer of Tuba and Euphonium at UCLA, where he has taught since 2013. During the summer seasons, he teaches and performs as an Artist Faculty at the Brevard Music Center. From 2012 - 2018, he was the principal tubist of the Charlotte Symphony Orchestra. He previously held positions as Principal Tubist with the Britt Festival Orchestra, the West Virginia Symphony Orchestra, the Santa Barbara Symphony Orchestra, and the Albany Symphony Orchestra.

Foard has been heard twice on NPR's Performance Today: once as a soloist performing Ralph Vaughan Williams' Concerto for Bass Tuba and again performing William Bolcom's Virtuosity Rag with brass quintet. Foard is the only tubist to have won the Music Academy of the West concerto competition twice. He has also been a prizewinner in the Minnesota Orchestra's Young Artist Competition (2003, 2008). In 2012, Foard performed both Vaughan Williams' and film composer John Williams Tuba Concertos with the West Virginia Symphony. He performed several times as a soloist with the Charlotte Symphony Orchestra, including a world premiere of a tuba concerto by Mark Petering in 2018.

Foard was born in Milwaukee, Wisconsin. He was the first tuba player to graduate from The Colburn School's Conservatory of Music, receiving an Artist Diploma. He also holds a Master of Music Degree from Rice University and a Bachelor of Music Degree from the Cleveland Institute of Music. He has studied with Alan Baer, Ron Bishop, David Kirk, Mark Lawrence, Norman Pearson, and Fritz Kaenzig.

External links 
 Official Website
 West Virginia Symphony Orchestra

References 

American classical tubists
Cleveland Institute of Music alumni
Musicians from Milwaukee
Living people
Rice University alumni
Classical musicians from Wisconsin
21st-century tubists
Year of birth missing (living people)
UCLA Herb Alpert School of Music faculty
21st-century American musicians
21st-century American male musicians
21st-century classical musicians